The 21st Pennsylvania House of Representatives District is located in southwestern Pennsylvania and has been represented by Sara Innamorato since 2019

District profile

The 21st District is located in Allegheny County and includes the following areas:

 Etna
 Millvale
 Pittsburgh (part)
Ward 02 (part)
Division 02 
Ward 06 
Ward 09 
Ward 10 (part) 
Division 01 
Division 02 
Division 03 
Division 04 
Division 05 
Division 06 
Division 07 
Division 10 
Ward 23 (part)
Division 01 
Division 03 
Ward 24 
Ward 26 (part)
Division 09 
Division 17
 Reserve Township
 Shaler Township

Representatives

Recent election results

References

External links
 District map from the United States Census Bureau

 Pennsylvania House Legislative District Maps from the Pennsylvania Redistricting Commission.  

 Population Data for District 21 from the Pennsylvania Redistricting Commission.

Government of Allegheny County, Pennsylvania
21